Ján Valach (born 19 August 1973) is a Slovak retired professional road cyclist. He represented his nation Slovakia in two editions of the Olympic Games (1996 and 2008), and later competed as a member of  professional cycling team before his official retirement in 2010. He now works as a directeur sportif for UCI WorldTeam .

Amateur and professional career
Born in Myjava, Valach made his official debut as an amateur cyclist at the 1996 Summer Olympics in Atlanta, where he finished sixty-eighth in the men's road race by less than a second behind the peloton leader Abraham Olano of Spain, recording his personal best time in 4:56:48.

In 2001, Valach became a Slovak champion in both road race and time trial at the elite championships, and thereby continued to defend both titles in the same tournament by the following year. When  folded after the 2002 season, Valach was left with no contract. Competing under a freelance agent, Valach pulled ahead from a vast field of cyclists to dominate the road race at the 2003 Coupe des Carpathes in Poland in 3:57:03.

Following a short demise from AKL and achieving mediocre results in numerous tournaments, Valach joined the  professional cycling team in the 2007–2008 season. He had solidified his lead by defeating the Austrian cyclist Michael Pichler at Völkermarkter Radsporttage road race, and also sprinted into a second-place finish at the second stage of Sachsen Tour in 5:52:17, trailing behind Great Britain's Dean Downing by less than a second.

Twelve years after competing in his last Olympics, Valach qualified for his second Slovak squad, as a 34-year-old, in the men's road race at the 2008 Summer Olympics in Beijing by receiving a berth from the UCI Europe Tour. Riding against his teammates Roman Broniš and Matej Jurčo, Valach remained as the only Slovak cyclist to successfully complete a grueling race with a sixty-second-place effort in 6:34:26. Valach's official result was later elevated to sixty-first position, when Italy's Davide Rebellin had tested positive for CERA that consequently stripped of his Olympic silver medal.

After he officially retired in 2010, Valach was appointed as the manager and head coach for Slovakia's  cycling team. In October 2016  announced that had been appointed as a directeur sportif.

Major results

1996
 1st Overall Okolo Slovenska
1st Stage 9
 7th Overall Tour de Langkawi
1997
 1st  Road race, National Road Championships
1998
 National Road Championships
1st  Road race
1st  Time trial
2001
 National Road Championships
1st  Road race
1st  Individual time trial
1st  Team time trial
 1st Prologue Tour d'Egypte
2002
 National Road Championships
1st  Individual time trial
1st  Team time trial
2003
 1st Coupe des Carpathes
2004
 2nd Road race, National Road Championships
2005
 2nd Time trial, National Road Championships
2007
 2nd Road race, National Road Championships
2008
 1st Völkermarkter Radsporttage, Austria
2009
 3rd Road race, National Road Championships

References

External links
NBC 2008 Olympics profile
2008 Olympic Profile – Sport Pravda Slovenska 

1973 births
Living people
Slovak male cyclists
Cyclists at the 1996 Summer Olympics
Cyclists at the 2008 Summer Olympics
Olympic cyclists of Slovakia
People from Myjava
Sportspeople from the Trenčín Region